The Indie Games Uprising is a developer led event designed to promote the "best of the best" Xbox Live Indie Games. The promotion was originally conceived by Robert Boyd of Zeboyd Games and Ian Stocker of MagicalTimeBean, when they noticed that they both had games coming out in the same time frame.

Promotions

Indie Games Winter Uprising
The first Indie Games Uprising launched in December 2010. The promotion was curated by developers Robert Boyd and Ian Stocker. Notable releases include Cthulhu Saves the World, Soulcaster II, Decimation X3 by Xona Games, and ZP2KX: Zombies & Pterodactyls! by Ska Studios. Boyd reported "spotty results" from the promotion, and cited developer's inability to set release dates on their games as a major issue. Shortly after the promotion, Microsoft allowed developers to select release dates for their games.

Indie Games Summer Uprising
Journalist Dave Voyles and Indie Games Winter Uprising developer Kris Steele of Fun Infused Games coordinated the second Indie Games Uprising. The Indie Games Summer Uprising opened up game submissions to the public, and were then narrowed down through rounds of voting. The Summer Uprising launched on August 22, 2011 and released one title daily from Monday through Friday. While developers reported a varying range of sales, Cute Things Dying Violently sold over 10,000 copies in its first month of release.

Indie Games Uprising III
The Indie Games Uprising III, scheduled to start on September 10, 2012, was curated by developer Michael Hicks and Summer Uprising coordinator Dave Voyles. Hicks expressed his interest in another promotion after he noticed a number of "exciting" games would be released around the same time as his own title Sententia.  Notable games include Gateways by the creator of The Adventures of Shuggy, and qrth-phyl from hermitgames, developer of the critically acclaimed Leave Home.

Indie Games Uprising Tribute
Launched on September 28, 2015, the Uprising aimed to highlight developers who started their career on Xbox Live Indie Games or gained something from publishing on the channel. Multiple games from previous Uprisings are featured, along with former XBLIG developers that are working on new projects for Xbox One, PlayStation 4 and Wii U.

List of games

Support
Though not officially involved, Microsoft has supported the Indie Games Uprisings with front page dashboard promotions on Xbox Live.

References

External links
 

Xbox network
Video game conferences